Filip Mráz (born 19 May 2001) is a Slovak professional footballer who currently plays for 2. liga club FK Pohronie as a midfielder, on loan from MŠK Žilina.

Club career

MŠK Žilina
Mráz made his Fortuna Liga debut for Žilina during a home fixture against FC ViOn Zlaté Moravce on 22 May 2021. He came on in the second half to replace Miroslav Gono.

References

External links
 MŠK Žilina official club profile 
 
 Futbalnet profile 
 

2001 births
Living people
Sportspeople from Žilina
Slovak footballers
Association football midfielders
MŠK Žilina players
FK Pohronie players
2. Liga (Slovakia) players
Slovak Super Liga players